Beauty Boarding is a hotel and restaurant located in old Dhaka. It is a historical center of the intellectual gathering of Bengali authors, poets, cultural activists, and politicians. The place has been widely commemorated in their arts and writings. Currently, the place is popular for serving Bengali food, though it also serves other Indian food.

History
The building was originally a zamindar house and belonged to a zamindar named Shudheer Das. Before Partition of India in 1947, the building was the office of the daily newspaper Shonar Bangla. By 1951, the newspaper moved its office to Kolkata. When the newspaper left, the building was rented by a local neighbour Nalini Mohon Saha and he started a restaurant and boarding house there. The boarding house was named after Nalini Mohan Saha's eldest daughter, Beauty. Soon Beauty Boarding became a popular place to book traders from all over the country used to come to Banglabazar, the centre of book publishing, printing and stationery wholesale market in Dhaka.

Architecture
It is a two-storied building with an open central courtyard. There are long verandas in front of the boarding rooms.

Significance as a literary hub
It is said that Shahid Qadri, a renowned poet and writer of post-1947 modern Bangla poetry, first started literary gatherings there with his friends and gradually the place became popular to poets and writers for its calm and green environment and availability of tea and snacks at a reasonable price.
Famous Bengali poet Nirmalendu Goon lived in Beauty boarding for almost five years and he notably mentioned this place in his autobiography. Poet and writer Syed Shamsul Huq created many of his famous works being in Beauty boarding. Painter Debdas Chakrabartee and the poets Shamsur Rahman, Abu Zafar Obaidullah, Rafiq Azad and Al Mahmud used to have their evening tea in this place.

References

External links
 
 

Buildings and structures in Dhaka
History of Dhaka
Restaurants in Dhaka